Johann Heinrich Callenberg (January 12, 1694 – July 11, 1760) was a German Orientalist, Lutheran professor of theology and philology, and promoter of conversion attempts among Jews and Muslims.

Life 
Callenberg was born in Molschleben of peasant parents. Beginning in 1715 he studied philology and theology at the University of Halle. Sometime before 1720 Salomon Negri, professor of Syriac and Arabic at Rome, stayed in Halle for six months. Callenberg studied Arabic under him. Besides Arabic, Callenberg also studied Persian and Turkish.

From his youth he cherished the idea of working for the conversion of the Muslims in the Middle East, Russia and Tartary, but later he devoted himself to missionary work among the Jews. In 1728 he established the Institutum Judaicum, the first German Protestant mission to the Jews, to which he attached a printing-office. In this office he printed the Gospel and other Christian books in the Judæo-German dialect, and distributed them among the Jews, with the assistance of the Jewish physician Dr. Heinrich Christian Immanuel Frommann. Frommann translated the Gospel of Luke with commentary which was revised and reprinted by Raphael Biesenthal in the 19th century. 

Callenberg also sent missionaries to other European countries, and was a patron of converted Jews. His plans for the conversion of Muslims were resumed somewhat later, but in these he utterly failed. 

From 1730 onwards, the Institutum Judaicum sent out more than 20 missionaries and existed until 1791.

In 1727 Callenberg was appointed extraordinary professor of theology at the University of Halle, and in 1735 professor of philology.  He died, aged 66, at Halle.

Works 
Among the works Callenberg published are the following:

 Prima rudivuenta linguse arabicx, Halle, 1729
 Scriptores de reliçione duhammedica, 1734
 Spécimen bibliolhecx arabicx, 1736
 Arabic translations of the New Testament, The Imitation of Christ, Luther's Catechism, etc.
 Kurtze Anleitung zur jüdischteutschen Sprache ertheilet von Joh. Heinrich Callenberg. Halle, 1733 (Digitized by Leo Baeck Institute, New York)

Sources 
 Werner Raupp (Ed.): Mission in Quellentexten. Geschichte der Deutschen Evangelischen Mission von der Reformation bis zur Weltmissionskonferenz Edinburgh 1910, Erlangen/Bad Liebenzell 1990 (ISBN 3-87214-238-0 / 3-88002-424-3), p. 218-228 (= 18th century: Mission among Jews).

Further reading 
 Werner Raupp: Callenberg, Johann Heinrich. In: The Dictionary of Eighteenth-Century German Philosophers. General Editors Heiner F. Klemme, Manfred Kuehn, vol. 1, London/New York 2010, p. 180–181.

External links

http://digitale.bibliothek.uni-halle.de Digital Bibliothek in Halle an der Saale
http://www.francke-halle.de/ Foundation of Francke where Callenberg worked

References

1694 births
1760 deaths
German Lutheran theologians
People from Saxe-Gotha-Altenburg
University of Halle alumni
Academic staff of the University of Halle
18th-century German Protestant theologians
German male non-fiction writers
18th-century German male writers